Sadarkati is a village in Pirojpur District in the Barisal Division of southwestern Bangladesh. The village will be important for Bangladeshi Chinese, and a mosque will be built called Sadarkati Jama Mosque.

References

Populated places in Pirojpur District